Rosa Wasanthe is a 2001 Sri Lankan Sinhalese romantic thriller film directed by Udayakantha Warnasuriya and produced by Soma Edirisinghe for EAP Films. It stars Ranjan Ramanayake, Kanchana Mendis, and debut actress Nisansala Jayatunga in lead roles along with Semini Iddamalgoda and Buddhika Jayaratne. Music composed by Rohana Weerasinghe. It is the 971st Sri Lankan film in the Sinhalese cinema. It marks as the fifth directorial effort of Udayakantha and the fifteenth production of E.A.P Films.

Plot

Hansamali is a young, village girl. She comes to Colombo for a job interview. She gets the job and stays with her childhood friend, Rejini. Rejini introduces Hansamali to her friend, Akila, who is a rugby player. Akila starts working at Hansamali's company. Eventually, Akila and Hansamali fall in love while Rejini has also a crush with Akila. While Rejini learns this, she leaves Hansamali. Akila and Hansamali get married and Rejini is married to her cousin, Gihan.

Hansamali gets a scholarship to Malaysia for 3 months and moves abroad. Akila lives in home alone. Rejini learns this and befriends with Akila. Eventually, this friendship turns to a relationship. Soon, Rejini gets pregnant with Akila's child. Akila is shocked and feels guilty for Hansamali. He demands Rejini to abort the child. While he leaving, he meets to Gihan and threatened by him.

Soon, Hansamali returns after finishing her course. Akila hides Rejini's truth from her. Akila and Rejini meet with an accident and Rejini lies that she had lost the child. Akila is relieved and lives happily with Hansamali. Some time later, Hansamali learns about Rejini's pregnancy truth from Gihan. She is shocked and moves to her village, leaving Akila alone again. Soon, Hansamali finds that she's also pregnant with Akila's child.

One day, Akila gets a call from hospital. When he went to there, he learns that Rejini died after the childbirth. The nurse informs him to Rejini was beaten by Gihan who is moved from country now which causes to Rejini's death. Akila decides to take care of his newborn daughter. He visits Hansamali with baby. Hansamali is shocked learning Rejini's death and accepts the baby. Thus, Akila and Hansamali reunite. The film ends with Akila and Hansamali live happily with their two daughters while Rejini's spirit watching them.

Cast
 Ranjan Ramanayake as Akila Sannasgala
 Kanchana Mendis as Hansamali
 Nisansala Jayatunga as Rejini
 Semini Iddamalgoda as Mihiri
 Buddhika Jayaratne as Gihan
 Wijeratne Warakagoda as Hansamali's father
 Umali Thilakarathne as Hansamali's sister

Music
Music and songs composed by Dr.Rohana Weerasinghe
 La hiru sevane - Samitha Mudhunkotuwa, Nirosha Virajini
 Nil Nuwan Sandelle - Gretion Ananda, Nirosha Virajini
 Thisara Vile - Gretion Ananda, Samitha Mudhunkotuwa

References

External links
නිල් නුවන් සැඳැල්ලේ

2001 films
2000s Sinhala-language films
Films directed by Udayakantha Warnasuriya